This article is about the particular significance of the year 1816 to Wales and its people.

Incumbents
Lord Lieutenant of Anglesey – Henry Paget, 1st Marquess of Anglesey 
Lord Lieutenant of Brecknockshire and Monmouthshire – Henry Somerset, 6th Duke of Beaufort
Lord Lieutenant of Caernarvonshire – Thomas Bulkeley, 7th Viscount Bulkeley
Lord Lieutenant of Cardiganshire – Thomas Johnes (until 23 April)
Lord Lieutenant of Carmarthenshire – George Rice, 3rd Baron Dynevor 
Lord Lieutenant of Denbighshire – Sir Watkin Williams-Wynn, 5th Baronet    
Lord Lieutenant of Flintshire – Robert Grosvenor, 1st Marquess of Westminster 
Lord Lieutenant of Glamorgan – John Crichton-Stuart, 2nd Marquess of Bute 
Lord Lieutenant of Merionethshire – Sir Watkin Williams-Wynn, 5th Baronet
Lord Lieutenant of Montgomeryshire – Edward Clive, 1st Earl of Powis
Lord Lieutenant of Pembrokeshire – Richard Philipps, 1st Baron Milford
Lord Lieutenant of Radnorshire – George Rodney, 3rd Baron Rodney

Bishop of Bangor – Henry Majendie 
Bishop of Llandaff – Richard Watson (until 4 July) Herbert Marsh (from 25 August)
Bishop of St Asaph – John Luxmoore 
Bishop of St Davids – Thomas Burgess

Events
10 February - Pembroke Dock's first Royal Navy ships are launched: HMS Ariadne and HMS Valorous.
7 May - Hay Railway opens throughout.
24 July - Old Wye Bridge, Chepstow (rebuilt in cast iron), is opened across the River Wye.
9 October - Fanny Imlay, half-sister of Mary Wollstonecraft Godwin, takes a room at the Mackworth Arms in Swansea, and instructs the maid not to disturb her. The following day she is found dead, having taken a fatal dose of laudanum.
 Nantyglo Round Towers built.
 Taliesin Williams, son of Iolo Morganwg, opens a school at Merthyr Tydfil.

Arts and literature

New books

English language
Ann Hatton - Chronicles of an Illustrious House
Samuel Johnson - A Diary of a Journey Into North Wales, in the Year 1774

Welsh language
Jane Ellis - Cerddi (first published Welsh language book by a woman)
Joseph Harris (Gomer) - Traethawd ar Briodol Dduwdod ein Harglwydd Iesu Grist

Music
John Ellis - Mawl yr Arglwydd (collection of hymns)

Births
11 January - Henry Robertson, Scots engineer responsible for building the North Wales Mineral Railway (d. 1888)
7 March - Huw Derfel Hughes, poet and historian (d. 1890)
3 June - John Ormsby-Gore, 1st Baron Harlech, politician (d. 1876)
11 June - Thomas William Davids, ecclesiastical historian (d. 1884)
16 August - Charles John Vaughan, dean of Llandaff and co-founder of University of Wales, Cardiff 
date unknown
Edward Edwards (Pencerdd Ceredigion), musician (d. 1897)
Edward Meredith Price, composer (d. 1898)

Deaths
23 April - Thomas Johnes, landowner and politician, 67
18 June - Thomas Henry, apothecary, 81
29 June - David Williams, Enlightenment philosopher, 78
4 July - Richard Watson, Bishop of Llandaff, 78 
17 July - John Lewis, missionary, about 24 (fever)
10 October - Fanny Imlay, half-sister of Mary Shelley, 22 (committed suicide at the Mackworth Arms in Swansea)
date unknown 
Benjamin Davies, first Baptist minister at Haverfordwest (age unknown)
David Jones, barrister ("the Welsh Freeholder"), c.51

References

 
 Wales